Yuvraj Thakur is an Indian television actor, model and writer. He is best known for portraying the role of Arjun Thakur in Humse Hai Liife and as Sammy on Bade Achhe Lagte Hain. He has also appeared in shows like Gumrah: End of Innocence, Pyaar Tune Kya Kiya, and MTV Fanaah. He was last seen playing the role of Azhar Khan in the MTV show Girls on Top.

Acting and modeling career
Thakur stepped into the modeling world by starting off as a commercial ad actor by working with an ad of Tata DoCoMo which turned out to be a big break for him. After starting with Tata Docomo, he appeared in several commercials such as Hero Maestro bikes, Horlicks, Vaseline Men's face wash with Shahid Kapoor, Vicco Shaving Cream and Renault cars.

Thakur started his acting career in 2011 by playing the role of Arjun Thakur in Humse Hai Liife.  He has also acted in the teen drama Best Friends Forever? on Channel V India and Bade Achhe Lagte Hain on Sony Entertainment Television India. He has also worked in the MTV Show Kaisi Yeh Yaariyan as Madhyam Singania aka Maddy. In 2016, he bagged a lead role of Azhar Khan on MTV Show Girls on Top. Followed by  appearing in an episode of MTV Big F as Zeeshan. In 2019, he was cast in a short film opposite Anupriya Goenka.

Personal life
Thakur is a fitness freak who spends most of his time at the gym.

Television

References

External links
 

Indian male television actors
Male actors from Maharashtra
Living people
1989 births